Multisport may refer to:

 Multi-purpose stadium, where different sports are played
 Multi-sport clubs, which compete in several sports
 Multi-sport event, such as the Olympic Games
 Multisport race, such as a triathlon
 Multisport video game

no:Mangekamp